The following drinks were named after places.

Non-alcoholic beverages

Coffee drinks
 Americano, diluted espresso, popularly believed to be after the habit of American soldiers in Italy in WW II
 Coffee, perhaps after the Kingdom of Kaffa, now in southwest Ethiopia
 Cuban espresso or Café Cubano — Cuba
 Georgia (coffee), after the state of Georgia, United States
 Greek frappé — Greece
 Indian filter coffee — India
 Ipoh white coffee, after the city of Ipoh, Perak, Malaysia
 Java, slang for coffee — named after the Indonesian island of Java
 Kurdish coffee after Kurdistan
 Marocchino, Italian for Moroccan
 Mazagran after the city of Mazagran, Algeria
 Mocha/Caffè mocha and Moka coffee, after the port city of Mocha in Yemen
 Mustang Coffee after the Mustang region of Nepal
 Thai iced coffee — Thailand
 Tenom coffee, after the town of Tenom, Sabah, northern Borneo, Malaysia
 Café Touba after the city of Touba, Senegal
 Turkish coffee — Turkey
 Vietnamese iced coffee — Vietnam
 Wiener Melange and Vienna coffee, after the city of Vienna, Austria

Coffee bean varieties
 Arabica coffee — Arabia
 Ethiopian Harar and Ethiopian Sidamo — Ethiopia
 Guadeloupe Bonifieur after the Caribbean island of Guadeloupe
 Jamaican Blue Mountain Coffee, from the Blue Mountains of Jamaica
 Kona coffee after the Kona District of Hawaii
 Liberian coffee — Liberia
 Maragogipe Coffee after the town of Maragogipe, Bahia, Brazil
 Mocha coffee bean after the port city of Mocha in Yemen
 Molokai coffee after the Hawaiian island of Molokai
 Monsooned Malabar after the Malabar Coast of southwest India

Drinking waters
 Acqua Panna after the village of Panna, Scarperia e San Piero, Tuscany, Italy
 Ambo Mineral Water after the town of Ambo, central Ethiopia
 Arrowhead Water after the rock formation in Arrowhead Springs, San Bernardino, California
 Bílinská kyselka after the city of Bílina, Czech Republic
 Borjomi from the Borjomi Gorge in the country of Georgia
 Deer Park Spring Water after the town of Deer Park, Maryland, USA
 Ein Gedi after the Ein Gedi oasis, Israel
 Evian after Évian-les-Bains, Haute-Savoie, France
 Fiji Water — Fiji
 Fuentealta after the springs of the same name in Teide National Park, Tenerife, Canary Islands
 Gerolsteiner Brunnen from Gerolstein in the Eifel mountains, western Germany
 Iceland Pure Spring Water and Icelandic Glacial — Iceland
 Londonderry Lithia after the town of Londonderry, New Hampshire, USA
 Malvern Water after the Malvern Hills, western England
 Mohai Agnes mineral water after the village of Moha, central Hungary
 Nabeglavi after the village of Nabeghlavi in the country of Georgia
 Ozarka after the Ozark Mountains, south central USA
 Panama Blue — Panama
 Pennine Spring after the Pennine Hills, northwest England
 Poland Spring after the town of Poland, Maine, USA
 Radenska after the town of Radenci, Slovenia
 Ramlösa after Ramlösa, a neighborhood of Helsingborg, southern Sweden
 San Pellegrino, after the town of San Pellegrino Terme, Lombardy, Italy
 Selters after the town of Selters, Hesse, Germany
 Seltzer water, a generic term for carbonated water named after Selters,  Germany
 Shollar water after the village of Şollar, northern Azerbaijan
 Sierra Springs after the Sierrra Nevada, California, USA
 Souroti water after the village of Souroti, near Thessaloniki, Greece
 Spa after the town of Spa, Liège, Belgium
 Tipperary Natural Mineral Water after County Tipperary, Ireland
 Vittel after the town of Vittel, Vosges, northeast France
 Volvic after the village of Volvic, Auvergne, France
 Whistler Water after Whistler, British Columbia, Canada
 Zephyrhills after the town of Zephyrhills, Florida, USA

Soft drinks
 Afri-Cola — Africa
 Auvergnat Cola after the Auvergne region, central France
 Baikal after Lake Baikal, Russia
 Blenheim Ginger Ale after Blenheim, South Carolina, USA
 Breizh Cola after Brittany (Breizh in Breton), western France
 Canada Dry — Canada
 Cavan Cola after the town of Cavan, Ireland
 Champagne cola, indirectly after the Champagne region of France
 Chicago Root Beer, a brand named after Chicago
 Clearly Canadian — Canada
 Cola Turka — Turkey
 Corsica Cola after the island of Corsica, France
 Cuba Cola, a Swedish soft drink named after the island nation of Cuba
 Delaware Punch via the Delaware grape after the city of Delaware, Ohio, USA
 Dublin Dr. Pepper, for Dublin, Texas, USA
 Guaraná Antarctica — Antarctica
 Inca Kola - Peru
 Italian soda —  Italy
 Kola Escocesa, a Peruvian soft drink named after Scotland
 Kola Inglesa, a Peruvian soft drink named after England
 La Croix Sparkling Water after La Crosse, Wisconsin, USA
 Lemon & Paeroa — from mineral water springs at the New Zealand town of Paeroa
 Paso de los Toros after the city of Paso de los Toros, Uruguay
 Perú Cola — Peru
 Polo-Cockta — Poland
 San Pellegrino, after the town of San Pellegrino Terme, Lombardy, Italy
 Sussex Golden Ginger Ale after Sussex, New Brunswick, Canada

Teas
 Anji bai cha or Anji white tea, after Anji County, Zhejiang Province, China
 Assam tea, after the state of Assam, northeast India
 Berinag tea after the town of Berinag, Uttarakhand, India
 Ceylon tea — Ceylon, old name for Sri Lanka
 Chinese herb tea — China
 Darjeeling tea, after the city of Darjeeling, West Bengal, India
 Dianhong after Dian Lake in Yunnan province, southern China
 English breakfast tea — England
 Formosa oolong tea after a historical name of Taiwan
 Hong Kong-style milk tea — Hong Kong
 Huangshan Maofeng, after Huangshan, a mountain range in Anhui province, China 
 Irish Breakfast tea — Ireland
 Junshan Yinzhen, from Junshan Island, Hunan province, China
 Kagoshima green tea from the Kagoshima Prefecture, Kyushu, Japan
 Kangra tea from the Kangra district, Himachal Pradesh, India
 Kashmiri tea, a.k.a. Noon Chai, from Kashmir
 Keemun, after Qimen County, Anhui province, China 
 Korean tea - Korea
 Labrador tea after the Labrador region of eastern Canada
 London fog after the city of London, UK
 Longjing tea, after the village of Longjing, Hangzhou, Zhejiang, China
 Lu'an Melon Seed tea, after the city of Lu'an, Anhui province, China 
 Maghrebi mint tea, after the Maghreb region of northwest Africa
 Mengding Ganlu tea after the Meng Mountain, Sichuan, China
 Nepali tea — Nepal
 Nilgiri tea after the Nilgiris District, Tamil Nadu, south India
 Pu-erh tea, after the city of Pu'er, southern Yunnan province, China
 Russian Caravan, a blend tea named after the tea trade through Russia
 Shanjuan Chunyue, after the Shanjuan Cave near Yixing, Jiangsu, China
 Söder tea after Södermalm, Stockholm, Sweden
 Thai tea — Thailand
 Tibeti, a fermented tea named after Tibet
 Turkish tea — Turkey
 Uji tea, from Uji, Kyoto Prefecture, Japan
 Vietnamese lotus tea — Vietnam
 Wuyi tea after the Wuyi Mountains of northern Fujian, China
 Xinyang Maojian tea, after the city of Xinyang, Henan province, China
 Yingdehong tea after the city of Yingde, Guangdong province, China

Other
 Capri Sun after the island of Capri, Campania, Italy
 Crodino after the town of Crodo, northern Piedmont, Italy
 Hawaiian Punch, after the Hawaiian Islands, USA
 Jumex after Mexico
 Nantucket Nectars after the island or town of Nantucket, Massachusetts, USA
 Tampico Beverages after the city of Tampico, Tamaulipas, Mexico

Alcoholic beverages

Beers

Styles
 American lager, American Pale Ale and American wild ale — United States
 Baltic porter — the Baltic region
 Berliner Weisse, after the city of Berlin, in Germany
 California common beer — a.k.a. steam beer, after California
 Dortmunder, from the city of Dortmund, in Germany
 Flanders red ale after the historical region of Flanders, Belgium
 Gose after the town of Goslar, Lower Saxony, Germany
 Gotlandsdricka, an ale named after the island of Gotland, Sweden
 Grodziskie after the town of Grodzisk Wielkopolski, western Poland
 Gueuze after the Geuzen street in Brussels, Belgium
 India pale ale — India
 Kentucky common beer — Kentucky, USA
 Kölsch, from Cologne in Germany (Köln in German)
 Kottbusser after the town of Cottbus, Brandenburg, Germany
 Pilsner after the city of Pilsen (Czech: Plzeň) in the Czech Republic
 Scotch ale — Scotland
 Vienna lager — Vienna, Austria

Brands
 Achel, after the village of Achel, Belgian Limburg
 Alaskan Amber after the state of Alaska, USA
 Alhambra after the fortress complex of Alhambra, in Granada, Andalusia, Spain
 Amstel after the Amstel river in the Netherlands
 Andechser after the town and abbey of Andechs, southern Bavaria, Germany
 Angkor Beer and Angkor Extra Stout, after the historical city of Angkor, Cambodia
 Arequipeña after Arequipa, Peru
 Ballarat Bitter, after the city of Ballarat, Victoria (Australia)
 Bauskas, after the town of Bauska, Latvia
 Bavaria, a Dutch beer named after the state of Bavaria, Germany
 Belhaven Best after the town of Belhaven, Scotland
 Beerlao after the country of Laos
 Beijing Beer, after the city of Beijing, China
 Berliner Pilsner after the city of Berlin, Germany
 Bitburger after the city of Bitburg, Germany, near the border of Luxembourg
 La Binchoise after the town of Binche, Hainaut, Belgium
 Bohemia, a Mexican brand named after the historical Czech region of Bohemia 
 Borsodi after the historical Borsod County, Hungary
 Bourgogne des Flandres after Flanders, Belgium
 Brunehaut after the town of Brunehaut, Hainaut, Belgium
 Březňák after the village of Velké Březno, Czech Republic
 Brisbane Bitter after the city of Brisbane, Queensland, Australia
 Budweiser an American brand named after the city České Budějovice ('"Budweis in German) in the Czech Republic
 Budweiser Budvar produced in České Budějovice
 Burgasko after the city of Burgas, Bulgaria
 Castle Eden Ale, after the village of Castle Eden, County Durham, northern England
 Cēsu after the town of Cēsis, Latvia
 Chernihivske after the city of Chernihiv, northern Ukraine
 Chimay after the town of Chimay, Hainaut, Belgium
 Chiswick Bitter after the Chiswick district of London, England
 Chouffe after the village of Achouffe, Belgian Luxembourg
 Christianssands Bryggeri (CB) after the city of Kristiansand, south Norway
 Ciney after the town of Ciney, Namur, Belgium
 Creemore Springs after the village of Creemore, Ontario, Canada
 Cusqueña, after Cusco, Peru
 Devils Peak Ale after the Devil's Peak, near Cape Town, South Africa 
 Dixie after the Dixie region of the United States
 Dommelsch after the village of Dommelen, North Brabant, Netherlands
 Dutch Gold, after the Netherlands
 Efes after the ancient Greek city of Ephesus (Turkish: Efes), western Turkey
 Einbecker after the town of Einbeck, Lower Saxony, Germany
 Erdinger after the town of Erding, Bavaria, Germany
 Estrella Galicia, after the Galicia region of Spain
 Faxe after the town of Faxe, Zealand, Denmark
 Flensburger after the town of Flensburg, Schleswig-Holstein, northern Germany
 Föroya Bjór after the Faroe Islands
 Galway Hooker after the city of Galway, Ireland
 Gösser after the town Göss, now a part of Leoben, Austria
 Grimbergen after the town of Grimbergen, Flemish Brabant, Belgium
 Grolsch after the city of Groenlo ("Grol" in 1615), Netherlands
 Gulpener after the village of Gulpen, Limburg, Netherlands
 Hanoi Beer after the city of Hanoi, northern Vietnam
 Harar Beer after the city of Harar, Ethiopia
 Harbin Beer after the city of Harbin, northeast China
 Hasseröder after the village of Hasserode, Saxony-Anhalt, Germany
 Helsingborgs after Helsingborg, Scania, southern Sweden
 Hengelo Bier after the city of Hengelo, Gelderland, Netherlands
 Hoegaarden after the village of Hoegaarden, Flemish Brabant, Belgium
 Huế Beer after city of Huế, central Vietnam
 Ichnusa after the ancient name of Sardinia, Italy
 Jenlain after the town of Jenlain, Nord, northern France
 Jever after the city of Jever, East Frisia, Germany
 Jupiler after the town of Jupille-sur-Meuse, Liège, Belgium
 Kalgoorlie Stout, after Kalgoorlie, Western Australia
 Kamenitza after the Kamenitsa Hill in Plovdiv, Bulgaria
 Karjala, a Finnish beer named after Karelia
 Karlovačko after the city of Karlovac, Croatia
 Kilkenny cream ale — originally produced in Kilkenny, Ireland
 Koblenzer after the city of Koblenz, Rhineland-Palatinate, Germany
 Kokanee after the Kokanee Glacier, British Columbia, Canada
 Korça after the city of Korçë, Albania
 Köstritzer after the town of Bad Köstritz, Thuringia, Germany
 Krombacher after the town of Krombach, North Rhine-Westphalia, Germany
 Kronenbourg after the Cronenbourg neighborhood of Strassbourg, (once the town of Kronenburg), Alsace, France
 Kulmbacher after the town of Kulmbach, northern Bavaria, Germany
 Lapin Kulta after Finnish Lapland
 Laško Brewery after the town of Laško, Slovenia
 Ledenika after the Ledenika cave, Bulgaria
 Leżajsk after the town of Leżajsk, south-eastern Poland
 Licher from the town of Lich, Hesse, Germany
 Lübzer after the city of Lübz, Germany
 Łomż after the city of Łomża, north-eastern Poland
 London Pride, after London, England
 Lvivske after the city of Lviv, western Ukraine
 Mariestads after the city of Mariestad, Sweden
 Melbourne Bitter after the city of Melbourne, Australia
 Michelob, an American brand named after the village of Měcholupy (German: Michelob), Czech Republic
 Milwaukee's Best and Old Milwaukee after the city of Milwaukee, Wisconsin, USA
 Mosi Lager after the Victoria Falls (Mosi-oa-Tunya), Zambia
 Murree beer after the town of Murree, northeastern Pakistan
 Narragansett after the Narragansett Bay (or the Narragansett people), Rhode Island, USA 
 National Bohemian an American brand named after the historical Czech region of Bohemia 
 Newcastle Brown Ale, after the city Newcastle upon Tyne in England
 Nokian Panimo after the town of Nokia, southwest Finland
 Norrlands Guld after the Norrland region of Sweden
 Odense Pilsner and Odense Classic, after the city of Odense, Funen, Denmark
 Obolon after the Obolon district of Kyiv, Ukraine
 Oettinger from the resort town of Oettingen in Bayern, Germany
 Old Vienna, a Canadian beer presumably named after Vienna, Austria
 Olympia Beer after the city of Olympia, Washington, Washington, USA
 Oud Beersel after the town of Beersel, Flemish Brabant, Belgium
 Paceña after the city if La Paz, Bolivia
 Pacífico, a Mexican beer named after the Pacific Ocean
 Parbo Bier after the city of Paramaribo, Suriname
 Phuket Beer after the island of Phuket, southern Thailand
 Pilsner Urquell after the city of Pilsen, Czech Republic
 Pirinsko Pivo after the Pirin Mountains, Bulgaria
 Quilmes after the city of Quilmes, Argentina
 Radeberger from the town of Radeberg, Saxony, Germany
 Rainier Beer after Mount Rainier, a volcano in Washington, USA
 Rheingold Beer after the river Rhine, western Europe
 Sagres after the town of Sagres, southwest Portugal
 Saigon Beer after the city of Saigon (now Ho Chi Minh City), southern Vietnam
 Saku after the town of Saku, Estonia
 Sapporo after the city of Sapporo, Hokkaido, Japan
 Sarajevsko pivo after the city of Sarajevo, Bosnia and Herzegovina
 Šariš after the town of Veľký Šariš, Slovakia
 Shangri-La Beer after Gyalthang, Yunnan, China, recently renamed Shangri-La City
 Shumensko after the city of Shumen, Bulgaria
 Sierra Nevada after the mountain range in California, USA
 Śląskie after the Silesia (Polish "Śląsk") region, mostly in Poland
 Soproni after the city of Sopron, western Hungary
 Spalter from the town of Spalt, Bavaria, Germany
 Starobrno after the city of Brno, Moravia, Czech Republic
 Strakonický Dudák after the Strakonice District, Czech Republic
 Taybeh Beer after the village of Taybeh, West Bank, Palestine
 Tecate after the city of Tecate, Baja California, Mexico
 Timișoreana after the city of Timișoara, western Romania
 Birra Tirana after the city of Tirana, Albania
 Topvar after the town of Topoľčany, Slovakia
 Trujillo after the city of Trujillo, northwestern Peru
 Trumer Pils after the town of Obertrum, Salzburg, Austria
 Tsingtao Beer after the city of Qingdao, Shandong province, China
 Tyskie after the city of Tychy, Silesia, Poland
 Utenos after the city of Utena, Lithuania
 Utica Club after the city of Utica, New York, USA
 Velebitsko after the Velebit mountains in Croatia
 Velkopopovický Kozel after the town of Velké Popovice, Czech Republic
 Victoria Bitter after the state of Victoria, Australia
 Viru after the Virumaa region, Estonia
 Waikato Draught after the Waikato region, North Island, New Zealand
 Warka after the town of Warka, central Poland
 Warsteiner from the town of Warstein, North Rhine-Westphalia, Germany
 Wernesgrüner from the village of Wernesgrün, Saxony, Germany
 Westmalle trappist after the village of Westmalle, Antwerp, Belgium
 Westvleteren after the town of Westvleteren, West Flanders, Belgium
 Windhoek after the city of Windhoek, capital of Namibia
 Wittinger from the town of Wittingen, Lower Saxony, Germany
 Wrexham Lager after the town of Wrexham, northeast Wales
 Xingu after the Xingu River in the Amazon Rainforest, Brazil
 Yorkshire Bitter after the historic county of Yorkshire, northern England
 Zagorka after the city of Stara Zagora, Bulgaria
 Zaječarsko after the town of Zaječar, Serbia
 Zundert from the town of Zundert, North Brabant, Netherlands
 Żywiec after the town of Żywiec, southern Poland

Cocktails
 Alabama Slammer after the state of Alabama, USA
 Agua de Sevilla after the city of Seville, Andalusia, Spain
 Agua de Valencia after the city of Valencia, Spain
 Asiático — Asia (original name was "Ruso" or Russian)
 Blue Hawaii after the Hawaiian islands, USA
 Boston after the city of Boston, USA
 Bronx after the borough of The Bronx, New York City, USA
 Brooklyn after the borough of Brooklyn, New York City, USA
 Cape Codder after Cape Cod, Massachusetts, USA
 Chicago Cocktail after the city of Chicago, USA
 Chimayó Cocktail after the town of Chimayo, New Mexico, USA
 Colombia after the country of Colombia
 Cuba Libre after the country of Cuba
 Curacao Punch after the Dutch Caribbean island of Curaçao
 Daiquiri after the beach and village of Daiquirí, southeast Cuba
 Colorado Bulldog after the state of Colorado, USA
 French Connection and French Martini after France
 Harlem Mugger after the Harlem neighborhood of New York City, USA
 Havana Cooler after the city of Havana, Cuba
 Irish car bomb, Irish coffee and Irish Flag after Ireland
 Japanese slipper after Japan, because of the Midori ingredient
 Jarabacoa Cocktail after the town of Jarabacoa, Dominican Republic
 Liégeois after the city of Liège, Belgium
 Long Island Iced Tea after Long Island, New York State, USA
 Lorraine after the region of Lorraine, northeast France 
 Lynchburg Lemonade after the city of Lynchburg, Tennessee, USA
 Manhattan after the borough of Manhattan, New York City, USA
 Missouri Mule after the state of Missouri, USA
 Mexican martini after Mexico, because of the tequila ingredient
 Moscow Mule after the city of Moscow, Russia
 New Englander after the region of New England, USA
 Panama after the country of Panama
 Pegu Club after the Pegu River, Burma
 Queens after the borough of Queens, New York City, USA
 Rüdesheimer Kaffee after the town of Rüdesheim am Rhein, Germany
 Black Russian, Blind Russian, Red Russian and White Russian — Russia
 Savoy Affair, Savoy Royale and Savoy Corpse Reviver after the Savoy in the western Alps
 Serena libre after the city of La Serena, Chile
 Singapore Sling after the city nation of Singapore
 Staten Island Ferry after the borough of Staten Island, New York City, USA 
 Tahiti Drink after the island of Tahiti, French Polynesia, South Pacific
 Tortuga after the island of Tortuga, Haiti
 Yungueño after the Yungas forest in Peru

Distilled drinks
 Agwa de Bolivia, a herbal liqueur named after Bolivia
 Amaro Sibilla, after the Sibillini Mountains, Italy
 Andong soju, after the city of Andong, South Korea
 Angostura bitters, after the city of Angostura, Venezuela, now named Ciudad Bolívar
 Ararat, an Armenian brandy named after Mount Ararat
 Armagnac, a brandy from the Armagnac region in Gascony, southwest France
 Atholl Brose, a whisky based drink named after the historical region of Atholl, Scotland
 Bacanora, an agave-derived liqueur named after Bacanora, Sonora, Mexico
 Blue Curaçao, an orange liqueur named after the Caribbean island of Curaçao
 Bourbon whiskey, after Bourbon Street, New Orleans, or Bourbon County, Kentucky, USA
 Calvados, after the Calvados region in Normandy, France (named after the )
 Canadian whisky — Canada
 Cantueso, after the Province of Alicante, Spain
 Chambord (liqueur), after the town or château of Chambord, Loir-et-Cher, France
 Chartreuse, after the Chartreuse Mountains, southeastern France
 Chios Mastiha, after the island of Chios, Greece
 Cognac, a brandy named after Cognac in France
 Disaronno, an apricot liqueur named after the town of Saronno, Lombardy, Italy
 Domaine de Canton, after Canton province, China
 Dutch brandy and Dutch gin — the Netherlands
 Floc de Gascogne after Gascony, a region in southwest France
 Herbs de Majorca, a liqueur produced on Majorca, Balearic Islands, Spain
 Irish cream, Irish Mist, Irish whiskey — Ireland
 Islay whisky, produced on the island of Islay, Scotland
 Koskenkorva Viina, after the village Koskenkorva in Ilmajoki, western Finland
 Lao-Lao, a rice whisky from Laos
 Lauterbacher Tropfen, after the borough of Lauterbach, Marienberg, Saxony, Germany
 Licor Beirão, after the historical province of Beira, Portugal
 Luzhou Laojiao, after the city of Luzhou, Sichuan, China
 Manx Spirit, produced on the Isle of Man in the Irish Sea
 Marpha brandy, after the village of Marpha in Nepal
 Mekhong, a Thai spirit named after the Mekong river
 Moskovskaya vodka, a Russian brand named after Moscow
 Nassau Royale, after the city of Nassau, Bahamas
 Pisang Ambon, a banana liqueur named after Ambon, Maluku Islands, Indonesia
 Pisco, a brandy named after the coastal city of Pisco, Peru
 Plymouth Gin, after the city of Plymouth, Devon, southwest England
 Riga Black Balsam, after the city of Riga, Latvia
 Sassolino, an anise-flavored liqueur from Sassuolo, Modena, Italy
 Schierker Feuerstein, after the village of Schierke, Saxony-Anhalt, Germany
 Scotch whisky — Scotland
 Śliwowica łącka, a plum brandy named after Łącko, south Poland
 Steinhäger, a gin named after the village of Steinhagen, Westphalia, Germany
 Tennessee whiskey, after the state of Tennessee, USA
 Tequila, after the city of Tequila, Jalisco, Mexico
 Vana Tallinn, an Estonian liqueur named after the capital city Tallinn
 Yukon Jack, after the Yukon territory, Canada

Brands
 Angostura Rum, after the city of Angostura, Venezuela, now named Ciudad Bolívar
 Beenleigh Rum, after Beenleigh, Queensland, Australia
 Belaya Rus vodka, after the country of Belarus
 Bombay Sapphire, a gin named after the Star of Bombay and indirectly the city of Mumbai, India
 Bundaberg Rum, after the city of Bundaberg. Queensland, Australia
 Carúpano after the city of Carúpano, Venezuela
 Clontarf, an Irish whiskey named after (the battle of) Clontarf, Dublin
 Comber Whiskey, an Irish whiskey produced in Comber, Northern Ireland
 Corzo, a tequila named after Chiapa de Corzo, Chiapas, Mexico
 Cracovia, a vodka named after Kraków, Poland
 Finlandia, a vodka named after Finland
 Glenfiddich, a Scotch whisky named after the River Fiddich valley
 Havana Club, a rum named after the city of Havana, Cuba
 Kihnu Mark, a vodka named after the island of Kihnu, Estonia
 Konig's Westphalian Gin, a Steinhäger named after the Westphalia region of Germany
 Mackmyra Whisky, after the village Mackmyra near Valbo, Gästrikland, Sweden
 Malibu, a Barbados rum originating in Curaçao and presumably named after Malibu, California
 Midleton Very Rare, an Irish whiskey produced in Midleton, County Cork, Ireland
 Newfoundland Screech, a rum named after the province of Newfoundland, Canada
 Penderyn, a whisky produced in the village of Penderyn, Wales
 Russian Standard, a Russian brand of vodka
 Skåne Akvavit, a spiced vodka named after the province of Scania, Sweden
 Slyrs, a German whiskey named after the Schliersee, Bavaria
 Takamaka Rum, after the Takamaka Region of Mahé, Seychelles
 Tanduay, a rum named after the former island of Tanduay, Manila, Philippines
 Tullamore Dew, an Irish whiskey named after the town of Tullamore, Ireland
 Viru Valge, a vodka named after the Virumaa region, Estonia
 Zacapa Rum, after the town of Zacapa, Guatemala

Wines

Wine grapes
 Acitana after the city of Acireale (or nearby villages Aci Catena, Aci Castello, etc.), Catania, Sicily, Italy
 Arnsburger after Arnsburg Abbey, Hesse, Germany
 Aspiran after the Aspiran, Hérault, southern France
 Auxerrois blanc and Gros Auxerrois after the historical  around Auxerre, Burgundy, France
 Barbera Sarda after the island of Sardinia, Italy
 Bianchetta Trevigiana after the Province of Treviso, northern Italy
 Biancone di Portoferraio after the town of Portoferraio on Elba, Tuscany, Italy 
 Blauer Portugieser after Portugal
 Blaufränkisch after the Franconia region of south-central Germany
 Bonarda Piemontese after the Piedmont region, northwestern Italy
 Busuioacă de Bohotin afgter the village of Bohotin, northeastern Romania
 Calabrese Montenuovo after the Calabria region in southern Italy
 Carignan after Cariñena, Aragon, Spain
 Catanese nero after the Province of Catania, Sicily, Italy
 Catawba after the Catawba River
 Chalosse Noire after the region of Chalosse, France
 Chardonnay after the town of Chardonnay, Saône-et-Loire, France
 Chasselas after the village of Chasselas, Saône-et-Loire, France
 Chenin blanc after Mont Chenin in Touraine, France
 Colombana nera after the Abbey of San Colombano in the town of Bobbio, Emilia-Romagna, Italy
 Cornalin d'Aoste after the Aosta Valley, northwestern Italy
 Cserszegi fűszeres after the village of Cserszegtomaj, western Hungary
 Ehrenfelser after Ehrenfels Castle (Hesse), Germany
 Freisamer after the city of Freiburg and the river Dreisam, Baden, Germany
 Frontenac after the town of Frontenac, Minnesota, USA
 Frühburgunder and Grauburgunder, after the historical territory of Burgundy, France
 Gamay after the village of the Gamay, south of Beaune, France
 Gewürztraminer after Gewürz'' ("herb, spice") and Tramin, South Tyrol, Italy
 Grasă de Cotnari after the village of Cotnari, Western Moldavia, Romania
 Grechetto and Greco, after Greece
 Green Hungarian — Hungary
 Helfensteiner after Helfenstein Castle, Württemberg, Germany
 Hondarrabi Zuri after the town of Hondarribia, Basque Country, Spain
 Hron after the Hron river, Slovakia
 Lagarino bianco after the Lagarina Valley in northern Italy
 Lagrein after the Lagarina Valley in northern Italy
 Limnio after the Aegean island of Lemnos, Greece
 Listán de Huelva after the province of Huelva, southwestern Spain
 Maceratino after the province and/or city of Macerata, Marche, Italy
 Madeleine Angevine; "Angevin" is the adjective of the county of Anjou and its capital Angers, France
 Madrasa after the village of Mədrəsə, Azerbaijan
 Malvasia after the Italian name for Monemvasia, Greece
 Marselan after the town of Marseillan, Hérault, France
 Mazuela after the town of Mazuela, Spain
 Melon de Bourgogne after the historical territory of Burgundy, France
 Montepulciano d'Abruzzo after the Abruzzo region of east-central Italy
 Mornen noir after the town of Mornant, east-central France
 Mourvèdre after Murviedro in Catalonia, Spain
 Müller-Thurgau, partially after the canton Thurgau, northeastern Switzerland
 Muscat d'Eisenstadt after the city of Eisenstadt, eastern Austria
 Muscat de Saumur after the city of Saumur, Pays de la Loire, France
 Muscat of Alexandria after the city of Alexandria, Egypt
 Muscat of Hamburg, aka Golden Hamburg and Black Hamburg after the city of Hamburg, Germany
 Nerello Mascalese after the town of Mascali, Sicily, Italy
 Nero d'Avola after the city of Avola, Sicily, Italy
 Orléans, a German grape named after the city of Orléans, north-central France
 Österreichisch-Weiß after the country of Austria
 Pascale di Cagliari after the city of Cagliari, Sardinia, Italy
 Pearl of Csaba after the city Békéscsaba, southeastern Hungary
 Persan after the hamlet of Princens near Saint-Jean-de-Maurienne, Savoie, France
 Petite Arvine, possibly after the Arve valley in Haute-Savoie, France
 Pineau d'Aunis after the historical province of Aunis, western France
 Prokupac after the city of Prokuplje, southern Serbia
 Prosecco bianco after the village of Prosecco, now a suburb of Trieste, Italy 
 Reichensteiner after Reichenstein Castle, Rhineland-Palatinate, Germany
 Sémillon after the town of Saint-Émilion, Gironde, southwest France
 Siroka Melniska after the town of Melnik, southwestern Bulgaria
 Smederevka after the city of Smederevo, Serbia
 Spätburgunder, after the historical territory of Burgundy, France
 Traminer after the town of Tramin an der Weinstraße, South Tyrol, Italy
 Trevisana nera after the Province of Treviso, northeastern Italy
 Triomphe d'Alsace after the historical Alsace region west of the Rhine
 Trollinger after the County of Tyrol in the Alps
 Uva di Troia after the town of Troia, Apulia, Italy
 Uva Tosca, named after though not originated in Tuscany, Italy
 Verduzzo Trevigiano after the Province of Treviso, Veneto, Italy
 Vernaccia di Oristano after the Province of Oristano, Sardinia, Italy
 Vien de Nus after the town of Nus, Aosta Valley, northwest Italy
 Vitovska after the village of Vitovlje, western Slovenia
 Wildbacher, after the village of Wildbach, near the town of Deutschlandsberg, Styria, Austria

Wines from France
 Alsace after the Alsace region
 Anjou after the historical province of Anjou
 Banyuls after Banyuls-sur-Mer
 Beaujolais after the historical province of Beaujolais
 Bergerac after the town of Bergerac, Dordogne
 Bordeaux after the city of Bordeaux
 Bugey after the historical region of Bugey
 Burgundy after the Burgundy region
 Cahors after the city of Cahors
 Chablis after the city of Chablis
 Champagne after the historic province of Champagne
 Cheverny after the village of Cheverny
 Collioure after the town of Collioure
 Condrieu after the town of Condrieu
 Côtes de Toul after the town of Toul
 Madiran after the town of Madiran
 Pineau des Charentes after the department of Charente
 Saint-Pourçain after the town of Saint-Pourçain-sur-Sioule

Wines from Italy
 Aglianico del Vulture after the historical region of Vulture 
 Albana di Romagna after the historical region of Romagna
 Alcamo after the town of Alcamo, Sicily
 Amarone after the town of Marano di Valpolicella, Veneto
 Asti after the city of Asti, Piedmont
 Barbaresco after the municipality of Barbaresco, Piedmont
 Barolo after the municipality of Barolo, Piedmont
 Brachetto d'Acqui after the city of Acqui Terme, Piedmont
 Brunello di Montalcino after the town of Montalcino, Tuscany
 Carmignano after the city of Carmignano, Tuscany
 Franciacorta after the territory of Franciacorta, Lombardy
 Gattinara after the municipality of Gattinara, Piedmont
 Gavi after the municipality of Gavi, Piedmont
 Marsala after the city of Marsala, Sicily
 Morellino di Scansano after the village of Scansano, Tuscany
 Moscato d'Asti after the city of Asti, Piedmont
 Nizza after the town of Nizza Monferrato, Asti, Piedmont
 Prosecco after Prosecco, now a suburb of Trieste 
 Ramandolo after the village of the same name near Nimis, Udine
 Sagrantino di Montefalco after the town of Montefalco, Umbria
 Soave after the small city of Soave, Veneto
 Taurasi after the town of Taurasi, Campania
 Vernaccia di San Gimignano after the town of San Gimignano, Tuscany
 Vino Greco after Greece
 Vino Nobile di Montepulciano after the town of Montepulciano, Tuscany

Wines from Spain
 Amontillado, after the town of Montilla, Córdoba
 Campo de Borja, after the Campo de Borja district of Aragon
 Jumilla, after the town of Jumilla, Region of Murcia
 Penedès after the historical region of Penedès, Catalonia
 Priorat, after the county of Priorat, Catalonia
 Rías Baixas after the Rías Baixas estuarine inlets, Galicia
 Ribera del Duero, after the Douro river, Castile and León
 Rioja, after the province of La Rioja
 Rueda, after the village of Rueda, Valladolid, Castile and León
 Sherry, a fortified wine named after the city of Jerez de la Frontera, Andalusia
 Tierra de León, after the Province of León
 Toro, after the town of Toro, Zamora, Castile and León

Wines from elsewhere
 Bristol Cream a blend created in Bristol, South West England
 Carmel Winery after the Carmel mountain in Israel
 Hock, indirectly from Hochheim in Germany
 Madeira wine, a fortified wine, and Plum in madeira, a dessert — Madeira islands of Portugal
 Mosel, from the valley of the Moselle in Germany
 Piesporter, after the village of Piesport, in the Moselle valley, Rhineland-Palatinate, Germany
 Port wine (or Porto), sweet fortified wine — Porto, in northern Portugal
 Rheingau, after the Rheingau ("Rhine district"), Hesse, Germany 
 Shiraz from Shiraz, Iran, unrelated to the Syrah or Shiraz grape
 Tokaji, after the town of Tokaj, northeastern Hungary

See also

 List of foods named after places
 List of words derived from toponyms

Notes

Geography-related lists
Lists of drinks